Phagsoo (also Fagsu) is a village and tehsil in the Doda district of the Jammu division of Jammu and Kashmir, India. It was previously part of the Thathri tehsil.

Geography
Phagsoo's boundaries are a dense forest in the north, two streams (Nallahs) in the east, and the town of Jangalwar in the south.

About and demographics
The nearest villages near Phagsoo are Jangalwar, Madan Chittar, Nowtass and Kahila.

Demographics
Its population is 2,709 (1,386 males and 1,323 females) living in 480 houses.

References

Chenab Valley
Villages in Doda district
Doda district